Otodus chubutensis, meaning "ear-shaped tooth of Chubut", from Ancient Greek ὠτ (ōt, meaning "ear") and ὀδούς (odoús, meaning "tooth") – thus, "ear-shaped tooth", is an extinct species of prehistoric megatoothed sharks in the genus Otodus, that lived during Oligocene, Miocene, and Pliocene epochs, approximately 28 – 5 million years ago. This shark is considered to be a close relative of the famous prehistoric megatoothed shark, O. megalodon. However, as is the case with O. megalodon, the classification of this species is disputed.

Taxonomy 
As is the case with other known megatoothed sharks, the genus of O. chubutensis remains in dispute. The Swiss naturalist Louis Agassiz first identified this shark as a species of Carcharodon in 1843. In 1906, Ameghino renamed this shark as C. chubutensis. In 1964, shark researcher, L. S. Glikman recognized the transition of Otodus obliquus to C. auriculatus. In 1987, shark researcher, H. Cappetta reorganized the C. auriculatus - O. megalodon lineage and placed all related megatoothed sharks along with this species in the genus Carcharocles. Finally, the complete Otodus obliquus to O. megalodon progression became clear and has since gained the acceptance of many shark researchers.

Within the Otodus lineage; O. chubutensis is the succeeding species of O. angustidens and is followed by O. megalodon. In short, O. chubutensis is considered a possible ancestor of O. megalodon. However, due to its co-existence with O. megalodon during the Miocene and Pliocene epochs, it is regarded as a morpho-species.

Size 

Paleoecology 
Paleontological research suggests that this species may have changed habitat preferences through time, or it may have had enough behavioral flexibility to occupy different environments at different times.

Diet 
Otodus chubutensis was likely an apex predator and commonly preyed upon fish, sea turtles, cetaceans (e.g. whales), and sirenids.

There is also potential evidence that Otodus hunted raptorial sperm whales; a tooth belonging to an undetermined  physeteroid closely resembling those of Acrophyseter discovered in the Nutrien Aurora Phosphate Mine in North Carolina suggests that a megalodon or O. chubutensis may have aimed for the head of the sperm whale in order to inflict a fatal bite, the resulting attack leaving distinctive bite marks on the tooth. While scavenging behavior cannot be ruled out as a possibility, the placement of the bite marks is more consistent with predatory attacks than feeding by scavenging, as the jaw is not a particularly nutritious area to for a shark feed or focus on. The fact that the bite marks were found on the tooth's roots further suggest that the shark broke the whale's jaw during the bite, suggesting the bite was extremely powerful. The fossil is also notable as it stands as the first known instance of an antagonistic interaction between a sperm whale and an otodontid shark recorded in the fossil record.

Fossil record 
This species is also known from fossil teeth and some fossilized vertebral centra. Shark skeletons are composed of cartilage and not bone, and cartilage rarely gets fossilized. Hence, fossils of O. chubutensis are generally poorly preserved. Although the teeth of O. chubutensis are morphologically similar to teeth of O. megalodon, they are comparatively slender with curved crown, and with presence of lateral heels feebly serrated. Fossils of this species have been found in North America, South America, Africa, and Europe. Its fossils have also been discovered in Asia and Australia.

Locations 
South America
 Chilcatay Formation, Peru
 Pirabas Formation, Brazil
 Jimol Formation, Colombia
 Cantaure Formation, Venezuela
North America
 Culebra Formation, Panama
 Arcadia Formation, Florida
 Pungo River Formation, North Carolina
 Calvert Formation, Delaware
Europe
 Bolognano Formation, Italy

See also 
 List of prehistoric fish
 Largest prehistoric organisms

References

External links 
 Carcharocles: Extinct Megatoothed shark from ELASMO
 Megatooth Shark Information - Facts, Evolution, Extinction, Fossil Examples from Fossilguy.com

chubutensis
Oligocene sharks
Miocene sharks
Pliocene sharks
Prehistoric fish of Africa
Fossils of Egypt
Prehistoric fish of Europe
Fossils of Italy
Paleogene fish of North America
Neogene fish of North America
Prehistoric fish of South America
Paleogene animals of South America
Neogene animals of South America
Paleogene Argentina
Neogene Argentina
Fossils of Argentina
Fossil taxa described in 1843
Taxa named by Louis Agassiz